The black jail is a U.S. military detention camp established in 2002 inside Bagram Air Base, Afghanistan. Distinct from the main prison of the Bagram Internment Facility, the "Black Jail" is run by the U.S. Defense Intelligence Agency and U.S. Special Operations Forces. There are numerous allegations of abuse associated with the prison, including beatings, sleep deprivation and forcing inmates into stress positions. U.S. authorities refuse to acknowledge the prison's existence. The facility consists of individual windowless concrete cells, each illuminated by a single light bulb glowing 24 hours a day. Its existence was first reported by journalist Anand Gopal and confirmed by many subsequent investigations.

Although U.S. President Barack Obama signed an order to eliminate black sites run by the Central Intelligence Agency in January 2009, that order did not apply to the black jail. However, in August, the Obama administration restricted the time that detainees could be held at the secret jail, and another like it at Balad Air Base in Iraq, to two weeks. Human rights organisations are concerned that the jail remains inaccessible both to the Red Cross and the Afghan Independent Human Rights Commission. The ICRC has claimed that it had been receiving names of inmates since 2009.

BBC News reported on May 11, 2010, that the Red Cross had confirmed its existence to them and that they had heard the accounts of former inmates.

See also
List of prisons in Afghanistan

References

External links

DIA and the Black Jail at Bagram
 Fresh claims US is running secret prison in Afghanistan BBC News, October 15, 2010

Extrajudicial prisons of the United States
Operations involving American special forces
Black sites
Detention centers for extrajudicial prisoners of the United States
2002 establishments in Afghanistan